Binta Ayo Mogaji is a veteran Nigerian actress. According to the film critic Shaibu Husseini, Mogaji has been a part of at least 800 films, television shows, and theater productions.

Personal life 
Born in 1964, Mogaji is a native of Agbo-Ile, Ibadan. Her father is an Islamic cleric, while her mother is an education administrator. In 2006, she married retired soccer player and physiotherapist, Victor Ayodele Oduleye. Prior to her marriage, she was romantically involved with actor, Jibola Dabo and had a son as a result of the relationship.

Career 
Her first home video film was Mojere, which was done in Yoruba. She was awarded best actress at the REEL Awards. In 2015, Mogaji debunked filmmakers' preference for younger generation actors in Nollywood. She explained that their reasons can not be based on the act of professionalism, because there is nothing younger actors were doing that the older ones can't still do. In a 2018 interview with The Punch, Mogaji explained that due to her Islamic background, she has never acted semi-nude or kissed throughout her decades of practicing as an actress. She noted that producers know the type of role she can play.

Partial filmography 
 Mama insurance (2012 film)
 Kasanova (2019)
 Pasito Deinde (2005)
 Àkóbí Gómìnà 2 (2002)
 Eni Eleni 2 (2005)
 Nowhere to be Found
 Why Worry the Barber?
 Sergeant Okoro
 Igbalandogi
 Mojere
 Owo Blow
 Ti Oluwa Nile (1992)
 Motherhood
 Owo Ale
 Ileke
 Ojuju
 Ile Olorogun
 The Bridge 
 Checkmate
Diamonds In The Sky (2019)
My Village People (2021)
The Miracle Centre (2020)
Man of God (2022)

References

External links 
 

Living people
1964 births
Actresses from Ibadan
20th-century Nigerian actresses
21st-century Nigerian actresses
Yoruba actresses
Actresses in Yoruba cinema
Nigerian film actresses
Nigerian television actresses
People from Oyo State